A Tamil Canadian computer-science student, Sarhajhan 'Sarachandran', is a member of the Tamil Tigers who pleaded guilty to trying to purchase anti-aircraft missiles for the militant group. He was convicted of supporting terrorism.

American Nadarasa Yogarasa was alleged to have helped Sarachandran concoct the plan, after Sarachandran contacted an FBI informant in Brooklyn, New York, about purchasing weapons for the Tigers. The informant sent him e-mails suggesting he had ten 9K38 Igla missiles and 500 AK-47s for $900,000, and suggested that the pair meet him in a New York warehouse. Two other Canadians, Sahilal Sabaratnam and Thiruthanikan Thanigasalam, accompanied the pair, who traveled claiming they were attending a bachelor party in the state.

A student at the University of Windsor, Sarachandran claimed to have been in direct contact with leader Velupillai Prabhakaran and had lately been speaking to intelligence chief Pottu Amman.

On January 26, 2009, he pleaded guilty, and two days later his co-defendants Sahilal Sabaratnam and Thiruthanikan Thanigasalam also pleaded guilty.

In January 2010, Sarachandran was sentenced to 26 years in prison.

References

Canadian people of Sri Lankan Tamil descent
Liberation Tigers of Tamil Eelam members
Living people
Year of birth missing (living people)